Karlodinium veneficum is a species of dinoflagellates belonging to the family Kareniaceae.

Karlodinium veneficum genome sizes have been reported as ~20 pg/cell and 4 pg/cell.

References

Gymnodiniales